Himansh Kohli (born 3 November 1989) is an Indian actor from Delhi. He is best known for his role as Raghav Oberoi in the Hindi drama Humse Hai Liife. He made his Bollywood debut with Yaariyaan (2014).

Biography
Kohli was born to father Vipin Kohli and mother Neeru Kohli and brought up in Delhi. Since his childhood he had been a big fan of Rajesh Khanna, drawing inspiration from him.

Career
Kohli worked as a Radio Jockey (RJ) at Radio Mirchi in Delhi from May to July 2011. He made his debut on TV with Channel V's daily soap opera Humse Hai Liife. He played the character Raghav Oberoi, the male protagonist in Humse Hai Liife. He was on the show from 5 September 2011 to 12 June 2012, and left when he was given a role in a feature film. He came back to the show in November 2012 to shoot for the show's final episode.

In May 2012, director Divya Kumar cast Kohli as one of the lead actors for the Bollywood movieYaariyaan, to play the character Lakshya. The film which was released on 10 January 2014 became a box office success.

In 2017, Kohli appeared in four films: drama film Jeena Isi Ka Naam Hai  directed by Keshhav Panneriy, romantic comedy Sweetiee Weds NRI, Ranchi Diaries, and Dil Jo Na Keh Saka.

Filmography

Films

Television

Music videos

References

External links

 
 

Male actors from Delhi
Living people
1989 births